Enneanectes carminalis, known commonlfix small tagy as the carmine triplefin or the delicate triplefin in Mexico and the United Kingdom, is a species of triplefin blenny. It is a tropical blenny known from reefs from Mexico to Panama, in the eastern central Pacific Ocean. It was originally described by D.S. Jordan and C.H. Gilbert in 1882, as Tripterygium carminale. Blennies in this species can reach a maximum length of 3 centimetres, and feed primarily off of benthic algae and invertebrates.

References

External links
 

carminalis
Fish described in 1882